Below Zero is a 2011 Canadian thriller-horror film. It is directed by Justin Thomas Ostensen, and stars Edward Furlong, Michael Berryman and Kristin Booth.

Plot

A screenwriter suffering from writer's block locks himself in a meat locker.  There, he hopes to come up with the perfect story for a horror film about a man trapped in a meat locker.  He imagines a story in which a man is menaced by an evil butcher.  However, reality and fiction begin to merge, and his imaginary butcher turns into a real threat.

Cast
Edward Furlong as Jack/Frank
Michael Berryman as Gunner
Kristin Booth as Penny
Dee Hannah as Mrs. Hatcher
Michael Eisner as Monty
Sadie Madu

Production
Writer Signe Olynyk developed writer's block whilst writing the film. In order to overcome it, she locked herself in a meat locker for five days to develop the story.

In February 2010, it was revealed that director Justin Thomas Ostensen would start filming in March 2010 in Canada. Then in March, The Hills Have Eyes actor Michael Berryman was announced to appear in the film as Gunnar. Edward Furlong was also announced in April 2012. In the same month Kristin Booth, Michael Eisner, Sadie Madu and Dee Hannah were also added.

Filming took place in Alberta, Canada.

The film was originally titled Below Zero 3D but in January 2012, it was revealed the 3D had been dropped from the film.

Release
The world premiere was at the Calgary International Film Festival, 18 September 2011.

The film had 31 official selections at film festivals, including:
A Night of Horror International Film Festival. Sydney, Australia (March 2012)
Arizona International Film Festival
Austin Film Festival. Austin, Texas, US (October 2011)
Derby City Film Festival. Louisville, Kentucky, US (February 2012)
Garden State Film Festival. Asbury Park, New Jersey, US (March 2012)
Independent Filmmakers Showcase Film Festival. Los Angeles, California, US (March 2012)
Indie Horror Film Festival. Chicago, Illinois, US (March 2012)

It was released on home video 28 August 2012.

Reception

Mike Saulters from Slackerwood.com gave a mixed review of the film, saying, "the story becomes a muddled mess that doesn't have a clear destination" and calls Kristin Booth's character "annoying as hell". However, Saulters praises the acting of Edward Furlong and Michael Berryman noting they are the "highlight of the movie".  Martin Unsworth of Starburst rated the film with 8 out of 10 stars and wrote that he expected it to be a routine slasher film, but it turned out to be "fresh and surprising".

Awards

Won
San Diego Film Festival: Best Screenplay
Toronto Independent Film Festival: Best Sci-Fi/Horror Film
Fright Night Film Fest: Best Soundtrack
Indie Horror Film Festival: Best Special Effects, Special Recognition 
Los Angeles Fear and Fantasy Film Festival: Best Screenplay
Prestige Film Awards: Gold Award for Best Script, Gold Award for Best Art Direction
American International Film Festival: Best Horror Movie

Nominated
 Hoboken International Film Festival: Best of the Festival, Best Feature Film, Best Screenplay, Best Actor (Furlong), Best Actress (Booth), Best Editor
Indie Horror Film Festival: Best Sound, Best Editing, Best Director, Best Feature Film.

References

External links

Official Website

2011 films
Films shot in Alberta
2011 horror films
Canadian horror thriller films
English-language Canadian films
2010s English-language films
2010s Canadian films